KVIV (1340 AM, "Radio Victoria") is a radio station broadcasting a Spanish Christian format. Licensed to El Paso, Texas, United States, the station is currently owned by El Paso y Juárez Compañerismo-Cristiano.

References

External links
 
 KVIV Facebook

 

VIV
Regional Mexican radio stations in the United States
VIV